The Chile Fracture Zone (CFZ) is a major strike slip fault and fracture zone in the Chile Rise. The Chile Fracture Zone runs in an eastwest direction almost parallel to nearby Juan Fernández Ridge and makes up a large part of the Antarctic—Nazca Plate boundary.

See also
List of fracture zones

Fracture zones
Seismic faults of Chile